Alberto Domínguez may refer to:
Alberto Domínguez (songwriter) (1911–1975), Mexican songwriter
Alberto Domínguez (rower) (born 1978), Spanish rower
Alberto Domínguez (footballer) (born 1988), Spanish footballer